The Non-Party List Liechtenstein (ULL) was a political party in Liechtenstein formed to contest the 1989 general election and prevent any of the larger parties from forming a majority. It did not reach the minimum vote threshold to gain seats in the Landtag, and subsequently dissolved in 1990.

Electoral results

References 

Defunct political parties in Liechtenstein
Political parties established in 1989
1989 establishments in Liechtenstein
Political parties disestablished in 1990
1990 disestablishments in Liechtenstein